Gisheh (also Romanized as Gīsheh) is a village in Bandan Rural District, in the Central District of Nehbandan County, South Khorasan Province, Iran. At the 2006 census, its population was 27, in 6 families.

References 

Populated places in Nehbandan County